Wolfgang Lakenmacher (born 8 October 1943 in Neuenhofe, Sachsen-Anhalt) is a former East German handball player who competed in the 1972 Summer Olympics.

In 1972 he was part of the East German team which finished fourth in the Olympic tournament. He played all six matches and scored eleven goals.

He is the father of Sven Lakenmacher who competed with the German handball team at the 2000 Summer Olympics.

References
sports-reference

1943 births
Living people
German male handball players
Olympic handball players of East Germany
Handball players at the 1972 Summer Olympics